Philip Zimmerman  is an American icon painter.

Life 
An Orthodox Christian convert from Calvinism, he has created hundreds of religious icons for churches and private collectors throughout the world. Through his workshops and seminars he has worked with more than 1,200 students in six countries.

Zimmerman studied under Rev. Richard Osacky, who was later consecrated bishop and known as Archbishop Job of Chicago and the Midwest, Orthodox Church in America.

A former art teacher in the public schools of Somerset County, Pennsylvania, he is based in New Florence, Pennsylvania at his studio, St. John of Damascus School of Sacred Art.

References
Rebekah Scott (2005). Pittsburgh Post-Gazette: Profile of Philip Zimmerman. Retrieved December 24, 2005.

External links
 Philip Zimmerman Website

Living people
20th-century American painters
20th-century American male artists
American male painters
21st-century American painters
21st-century American male artists
Artists from Pittsburgh
Year of birth missing (living people)
Indiana University of Pennsylvania alumni
Eastern Orthodox Christians from the United States
Converts to Eastern Orthodoxy from Protestantism